Three to One Against is a 1923 British silent comedy film directed by George A. Cooper and starring Florence Wood, Cecil del Gue and Judd Green.

Cast
 Florence Wood as Mrs. Musquash  
 Cecil del Gue as Soldier  
 Judd Green as Sailor  
 Gibb McLaughlin as Cleric

References

Bibliography
 Murphy, Robert. Directors in British and Irish Cinema: A Reference Companion. British Film Institute, 2006.

External links

1923 films
1923 comedy films
British silent short films
British comedy films
Films directed by George A. Cooper
British black-and-white films
1920s English-language films
1920s British films
Silent comedy films